Emmanuel Stars is a Ghanaian professional football club, based in Tarkwa, Western Region. They are competing in the 2012–13 Poly Tank Division One League after being relegated at the end of the 2011–12 Glo Premier League season.

Although the club was only founded in 2008, it has undergone two name changes. The club has previously been known as FC Medeama and Wassaman United.

Club history 
Wassaman United was founded in 2008 as FC Medeamaa and was renamed in 2010 when the then owner Moses Armah bought the first division club Kessben FC. Wassaman United plays its home games at the TNA Park from  September 2011 and for the 2011–12 season of the Glo Premier League.

In July 2013, the club was renamed to Emmanuel Stars and was bought by Nigerian pastor TB Joshua.

Technical team 
Chief-Trainer
 Abubakar Yusif

Co-Trainer
 Ben Zola

CEO
 Kingsley Edmund Baidoo

Titles 
as FC Medeamaa

 2008: 12th Central Region Second Division
 2009: Middle League
 2010: Poly Tank Division One League (Master Group 2B)

Managers 
 2008–2010:Abdul-Karim Zito
 2010–2011: Paa Kwesi Fabin
 2011: Herbert Addo
 2011–Present: Abubakar Yusif

References and notes 

Football clubs in Ghana
2008 establishments in Ghana
Association football clubs established in 2008
Western Region (Ghana)